Pamela Jean Scheunemann Chenevert (born October 25, 1955 in Minneapolis, Minnesota) is an American children's writer, best known for her Cool Crafts picture books and as the founding member of the Minnesota Book Builders.

Life and work 
Scheunemann graduated from Robbinsdale High School in 1973 and moved on to Minneapolis Community College to study English. She later attended the Minneapolis College of Art & Design for design coursework.

In 1980, Scheunemann took the position of production manager for New Homes Magazine and moved on to become the vice president for the company. After leaving the company in 1988, she became the production manager for Meadowbrook Press until 1990 and then for CompCare Publishers from 1990 to 1993.

Scheunemann started her career as a children's book author in 2000 with the Blends Series. Since then, she has published nearly 150 children's books, ranging in reading levels from first to sixth grades. She now serves as the office and production manager, as well as a writer for Mighty Media, inc. in Minneapolis, where she has been since 1993.

Books 
Series: Time (Abdo Publishing, 2008)
 Time to Learn About Day & Night (ABDO Publishing Company, 2010) . 
 Time to Learn About Measuring Time
 Time to Learn About Past, Present & Future
 Time to Learn About Seasons & Years
 Time to Learn About Seconds, Minutes & Hours
 Time to Learn About Weeks & Months
Series: Critter Chronicles (Abdo Publishing, 2007)
 Crocodile Tears
 Peacock Fan
 Pelican’s Pouch
 Spelling Bee
 Series: Cool Collections (Abdo Publishing, 2007)
 Cool Coins
 Series: Animal Tales (Abdo Publishing, 2006)
 Bear Claws
 Cat Tails
 Cow Licks
 Pig Pens
 Series: First Words (Abdo Publishing, 2006)
 Big Bug, Little Bug
 Come and See My Game!
 Come for a Party!
 The Cow Said Meow!
 Is This a Flower?
 Look at Me!
 Meg and I
 The Puppy Is for Me!
 Rainy Day
 This Is Not My Dog!
 We Like Music!
 We Like to Play!
 Series: First Rhymes (Abdo Publishing, 2006)
 The Band in the Sand
 The Chick on the Thick Brick
 Drew and the Crew
 The Frog in the Clog
 The King ona Spring
 The One-Cent Tent
 The Pot with a Dot
 The Pug with a Mug
 The Raccoon and the Balloon
 The Skunk and His Junk
 The Sub Club
 Ted’s Red Sled
 Series: First Sounds (Abdo Publishing, 2005)
 Skye and Skip
 Sloane and Sly
 Stacy and Steve
 Tam and Tom
 Tracy and Trevor
 Ulma and Upton
 Unity and Uri
 Val and Vince
 Wendy and Wally
 Whitney and Wheeler
 Yana and Yosef
 Zoe and Zach
 Series: Rhyme Time (Abdo Publishing, 2005)
 The Crain Loves Grain
 Four Soar and Roar
 Lou Flew Too!
 Peas and Cheese
 The Rare Fair
 Tennis in Venice
 Series: Cool Crafts (Abdo Publishing, 2005)
 Cool Beaded Jewelry
 Cool Clay Projects
 Series: Rhyming Riddles (Abdo Publishing, 2004)
 Ape Cape
 Chipper Flipper
 Cooler Ruler
 Dill Spill
 Loud Crowd
 Overdue Kangaroo
 Series: Keeping the Peace (Abdo Publishing, 2004)
 Acting With Kindness
 Being a Peacekeeper
 Coping with Anger
 Dealing with Bullies
 Learning About Differences
 Working Together
 Series: United We Stand (Abdo Publishing, 2003)
 Courage
 Patriotism
 Tolerance
 Series: Word Families (Abdo Publishing, 2003)
 ent as in cent
 ing as in king
 ink a in drink
 ick as in kick
 unk as in skunk
 ash as in trash
 ack as in snack
 aw as in paw
 Series: Homophones (Abdo Publishing, 2002)
 Flour Does Not Flower
 Fred Read the Red Book
 Harry is Not Hairy
 Sam Has a Sundae on Sunday
 The Moose Is in the Mousse
 Two Kids Got to Go, Too
 Series: Capital Letters (Abdo Publishing, 2001)
 Cities
 Days
 Months
 Names
 Places
 States
 Series: Blends (Abdo Publishing, 2000 and 2001)
 dr
 ght
 sl
 ch
 st

References

External links 
Minnesota Bookbuilders
Mighty Media, Inc.

American children's writers
Living people
1955 births